Nathan Wesley Hale (February 11, 1860 – September 16, 1941) was an American politician and a member of the United States House of Representatives for the 2nd congressional district of Tennessee.

Biography
Born on February 11, 1860, near Gate City, Virginia, in Scott County, Hale was the son of Drayton Smithton and Ruth C. Frazier Hale. He attended the common schools of Nicholasville, Virginia and Kingsley Academy near Kingsport, Tennessee.

Career
Hale taught school at Hale's Mill, Virginia in 1876. He moved to Knoxville, Tennessee, in 1878 and engaged in the nursery business as well as the wholesale dry goods business, banking, and farming. He married Laura Adelaide Sebastian in 1890, and they had five children. He served as a member of the Tennessee House of Representatives from 1891 to 1893. He was a member of the Tennessee Senate from 1893 to 1895. He was an unsuccessful candidate for the Republican nomination in 1902 as a Representative to the Fifty-eighth Congress.

Elected as a Republican to the Fifty-ninth and Sixtieth Congresses, Hale served from March 4, 1905, to March 3, 1909.  He was an unsuccessful candidate for re-election in 1908 to the Sixty-first Congress.

Hale was a delegate to the Republican National Convention in 1908 and a member of the Republican National Committee from 1908 to 1912. In 1909, he moved to Los Angeles, California, and engaged in the oil and real estate business until his death.

Death
On September 16, 1941, Hale died in Alhambra, California, at age 81 years, 217 days. He is interred at Rose Hills Memorial Park in Whittier, California. Hale Road in Knoxville is named after him.

References

External links
 

1860 births
1941 deaths
People from Gate City, Virginia
Members of the Tennessee House of Representatives
Tennessee state senators
Republican Party members of the United States House of Representatives from Tennessee
California Republicans
19th-century American politicians
20th-century American politicians
Politicians from Knoxville, Tennessee
Burials at Rose Hills Memorial Park